A series of meetings between Sicilian Mafia and American Mafia members were allegedly held at the Grand Hotel et des Palmes in Palermo, Sicily, between October 12–16, 1957. Also called the 1957 Palermo Mafia summit, the summit discussed the international illegal heroin trade in the French Connection. The FBI believed it was this meeting that established the Bonanno crime family in the heroin trade.

Origins of reputed purpose
This "heroin summit" was described by journalist Claire Sterling: "Although there is no firsthand evidence of what went on at the four-day summit itself, what followed over the next thirty years has made the substance clear. Authorities on both sides of the Atlantic are persuaded by now that the American delegation asked the Sicilians to take over the import and distribution of heroin in the United States, and the Sicilians agreed." However, she fails to back this claim with solid evidence. Sterling even has the dates of the alleged meeting wrong.

At the time, although the Sicilian Mafia was involved to some extent in the heroin business all through the 1950s and 1960s, it never had anything more than a secondary role in the world drugs system. According to the McClellan Hearings, Sicily was no more than a staging-post in the shipment of French-produced heroin to the USA. Until the 1970s, Sicilian mafiosi were prevented from acquiring any oligopoly on the heroin market because they were not competitive in comparison with other European criminal groups, in particular the French Connection by Corsican groups in Marseille.

The first mention of the "summit" in the United States was during the McClellan Hearings on October 10–16, 1963. Among the American mafiosi present were Joe Bonanno, his underbosses and advisors Carmine Galante, John Bonventre and Frank Garofalo, as well as Lucky Luciano, Santo Sorge, John Di Bella, Vito Vitale and Gaspare Magaddino. While among the Sicilian side there were Salvatore "Little Bird" Greco and his cousin Salvatore Greco, also known as "l'ingegnere" or "Totò il lungo", Giuseppe Genco Russo, Vincenzo Rimi and Filippo Rimi, Angelo La Barbera, Gaetano Badalamenti, Totò Minore, Rosario Mancino, Calcedonio Di Pisa, Cesare Manzella, Gioacchino Pennino and Tommaso Buscetta.

No first-hand accounts
There are no first-hand accounts of the meeting, except for the version of Mafia turncoat Tommaso Buscetta, who denied a summit ever took place at all. According to Buscetta, Bonanno did stay at the Grand Hotel des Palmes and received many guests all the time, but there was no summit as such. In his memoirs, Joe Bonanno mentions his trip to Palermo, but says nothing about a summit.

According to Buscetta a gathering took place in a private room at the Spanò seafood restaurant on the evening of October 12, 1957, where Bonanno was fêted as the guest of honour by his old friend Lucky Luciano. Among the other guests were Bonanno’s underboss Carmine Galante, the brothers Salvatore and Angelo La Barbera, Salvatore "Little Bird" Greco, Gaetano Badalamenti, Gioacchino Pennino, Cesare Manzella, Rosario Mancino, Filippo and Vincenzo Rimi, and Tommaso Buscetta. According to Buscetta, it was at this dinner that Bonanno suggested to form a Sicilian Mafia Commission to avoid violent disputes, following the example of the American Mafia that had formed their Commission in the 1930s.

The Italian police had been following Luciano and in so doing found out about the meetings. They observed the gatherings. However, the report was buried in some filing cabinet in Palermo. A copy was sent to the Federal Bureau of Narcotics in Washington. Only eight years later the report was used to indict the participants and some of their associates in Palermo.

Trial against participants
In August 1965, the Palermo public prosecutors indicted 17 main participants  associated with the Sicilian and American Mafia by judge Aldo Vigneri for criminal conspiracy and narcotics and currency rackets that allegedly started with the 1957 Palermo summit. Among the indicted were Bonanno, Bonventre, Galante, Sorge, Magaddino, John Priziola, Raffaele Quasarano, Frank Coppola and Joe Adonis. The Court of Palermo dismissed the charges in June 1968 because of lack of evidence.

What can be said about the events in October 1957 in Palermo is that the gatherings reforged the links between the most Sicilian of the American Five Families, the Bonanno Crime Family, and the most American of the Sicilian Mafia families. It was not a conference between "the" Sicilian Mafia and "the" American Cosa Nostra as such.

Heroin trafficking between these two groups might have been discussed, but there certainly was not a general agreement on the heroin trade between "the" Sicilian Mafia and "the" American Cosa Nostra. The important result of 1957 Palermo gatherings was that the Sicilian Mafia composed its first Sicilian Mafia Commission and appointed "Little Bird" Greco as its first "primus inter pares".

References

 Arlacchi, Pino (1994). Addio Cosa nostra: La vita di Tommaso Buscetta, Milan: Rizzoli 
Arlacchi, Pino (1988). Mafia Business. The Mafia Ethic and the Spirit of Capitalism, Oxford: Oxford University Press 
Bonanno, Joseph & Sergio Lalli (1983). A Man of Honour. The Autobiography of a Godfather, London: André Deutsch Ltd.
Dickie, John (2004). Cosa Nostra. A history of the Sicilian Mafia, London: Coronet 
Gambetta, Diego (1993).The Sicilian Mafia: The Business of Private Protection, London: Harvard University Press, 
Shawcross, Tim & Martin Young (1987). Men Of Honour: The Confessions of Tommaso Buscetta,  Collins 
Sterling, Claire (1990). Octopus. How the long reach of the Sicilian Mafia controls the global narcotics trade, New York: Simon & Schuster, 

History of the Sicilian Mafia
Organized crime events in Italy
Mafia meetings
1957 in Italy
History of Palermo
1957 conferences
1957 crimes in Italy